Bluewater is a census-designated place (CDP) in McKinley County, New Mexico, United States. It was first listed as a CDP prior to the 2020 census.

The community is on the southern edge of the county, bordered to the south by Cibola County. It is in the Las Tusas Valley and is bordered to the north by Cottonwood Creek, which flows east into Bluewater Lake, a reservoir on Bluewater Creek, which continues east to the Rio San Jose at Bluewater Village in Cibola County.

New Mexico State Road 612 (Bluewater Road) passes through the Bluewater CDP, leading northwest  to Thoreau and Interstate 40.

Demographics

Education
It is in Gallup-McKinley County Public Schools.

It is zoned to Thoreau Elementary School, Thoreau Middle School, and Thoreau High School.

References 

Census-designated places in McKinley County, New Mexico
Census-designated places in New Mexico